Viļķene Parish is an administrative unit of Limbaži Municipality in the Vidzeme region of Latvia.

It borders with Pāle, Katvari and Limbaži parishes, Liepupe Parish of Salacgrīva Municipality and Salacgrīva rural territory.

Area: 224.5 km²

Population: 1,253 (2011)

Towns, villages and settlements of Viļķene Parish 
  - parish administrative center

Notable residents 
Kārlis Baumanis (May 11, 1835 – January 10, 1905), composer of the Latvian national anthem, "Dievs, svētī Latviju!", was born in Viļķene.

References 

Parishes of Latvia
Limbaži Municipality
Vidzeme